Say It with Music was an early Australian television series. It aired on Sydney station TCN-9 from 21 February 1957 to 15 April 1958. Hosted by pianist Frank Lawrence and his wife, Marie Lawrence, the series was a variety show.

The half-hour series featured entertainers such as singers, dancers, instrumentalists, and jugglers and was intended for "late evening relaxation".

It is not known if any of the episodes are still extant as kinescope recordings.

References

External links

Nine Network original programming
Australian variety television shows
English-language television shows
Black-and-white Australian television shows
1957 Australian television series debuts
1958 Australian television series endings